Claude Lowenstein (26 October 1921 – 22 November 2010) was a French coxswain. He competed at the 1936 Summer Olympics in Berlin with the men's eight where they were eliminated in the semi-final.

References

1921 births
2010 deaths
French male rowers
Olympic rowers of France
Rowers at the 1936 Summer Olympics
Coxswains (rowing)
European Rowing Championships medalists